"One That Got Away" is a song written by Jesse Frasure, Josh Osborne, Matthew Ramsey and Trevor Rosen, and recorded by American country music singer Michael Ray. It is the second single from his second studio album, Amos.

Content
The Boot described the song as "Ray focuses on enjoying the ride while it lasts and coming out of the relationship with a great story to tell. Summery and upbeat, the song makes for a perfect addition to his festival setlists." Ray said that he wanted a "loose feel" when recording the song, and said that the song's content of enjoying a relationship reminded him of his upbringing. Ray said that he compared it to the feel of "Kiss You in the Morning", and that its content was "definitely one of those that I have lived".

Music video
Sean Hagwell directed the music video, which was filmed in Miami, Florida.

Charts

Weekly charts

Year-end charts

Certifications

References

2018 singles
2018 songs
Michael Ray (singer) songs
Songs written by Jesse Frasure
Songs written by Josh Osborne
Songs written by Trevor Rosen
Songs written by Matthew Ramsey
Song recordings produced by Scott Hendricks
Atlantic Records singles
Warner Records singles